Abderrazak Djahnit (born 8 January 1966) is an Algerian footballer. He played in two matches for the Algeria national football team in 1989 and 1990. He was also named in Algeria's squad for the 1990 African Cup of Nations tournament.

References

External links
 

1968 births
Living people
Algerian footballers
Algeria international footballers
1990 African Cup of Nations players
Africa Cup of Nations-winning players
Place of birth missing (living people)
Association football forwards
21st-century Algerian people
JS Kabylie players